This is a list of German television related events from 2010.

Events
12 March - Lena is selected to represent Germany at the 2010 Eurovision Song Contest with her song "Satellite". She is selected to be the fifty-fifth German Eurovision entry during Unser Star für Oslo held at the Brainpool Studios in Cologne.
17 April - Mehrzad Marashi wins the seventh season of Deutschland sucht den Superstar.
28 May - Commissario Laurenti actress Sophia Thomalla and her partner Massimo Sinato win the third season of Let's Dance.
29 May - Germany wins the 55th Eurovision Song Contest in Oslo, Norway. The winning song is "Satellite" performed by Lena.
9 August - Timo Grätsch wins the tenth season of Big Brother Germany.
20 August - Launch of the German version of The X Factor.
9 November - Edita Abdieski wins the first season of X Factor.
18 December - 56-year-old classical singer Freddy Sahin-Scholl wins the fourth season of Das Supertalent.

Debuts

Domestic
12 April - 
Danni Lowinski (2010–2014) (Sat.1)
Der letzte Bulle (2010–2014) (Sat.1)
27 April - Im Angesicht des Verbrechens (2010) (Arte)
20 August - X Factor (2010-2012) (RTL)
13 October - Rette die Million! (2010-2013) (ZDF)

BFBS
 Downton Abbey (2010-2015)
/ The Octonauts (2010-present)
 Alphablocks (2010-2013)

Television shows

1950s
Tagesschau (1952–present)

1960s
 heute (1963-present)

1970s
 heute-journal (1978-present)
 Tagesthemen (1978-present)

1980s
Wetten, dass..? (1981-2014)
Lindenstraße (1985–present)

1990s
Gute Zeiten, schlechte Zeiten (1992–present)
Marienhof (1992–2011)
Unter uns (1994-present)
Verbotene Liebe (1995-2015)
Schloss Einstein (1998–present)
In aller Freundschaft (1998–present)
Wer wird Millionär? (1999-present)

2000s
Big Brother Germany (2000-2011, 2015–present)
Deutschland sucht den Superstar (2002–present)
Let's Dance (2006–present)
Das Supertalent (2007–present)

Ending this year

Births

Deaths

See also 
2010 in Germany